Guy of Ibelin (French: Guy d'Ibelin) (1250/1255 – 1304), of the Ibelin family, was count of Jaffa and Ascalon during the latter part of the Crusades. He was the son of John of Ibelin (aka John of Jaffa) and Maria of Barbaron. He was count in name only.  His father, John of Jaffa, had died in 1266, after which the fragile truce with the Muslims collapsed, and Jaffa was captured by Baibars in 1268. John was probably succeeded by Guy's older brother James, who held the title of Count of Jaffa until his death in 1276, at which point the title passed to Guy.

In 1299/1300, Guy was able to capture Byblos with a Genoese fleet, but held it only briefly. He also met with the Mongol leader Kutlushah in 1301, in an unsuccessful attempt to coordinate a military attack against the Muslims. In 1302 he and his family were captured by pirates while staying at their ancestral fiefdom in Episcopia, Cyprus.

He died on February 14, 1304, and was buried in Nicosia, Cyprus, in a pauper's grave in accordance with his vows. Guy must have been held in high regard on the island, judging from the turmoil following his death reported by the chronicler Amadi.

Family
Guy married twice. His second wife was Maria, Lady of Ascalon and Naumachia, daughter of Philip of Ibelin and Simone de Montbeliard.  Guy and Maria had five children:
 Philip (born before 1293, died 1315/1316 in Kyrenia), Count of Jaffa
 John (died 1315/1316 in Kyrenia)
 Maria (b. 1294, died before 1318), first wife of the man who later became Hugh IV of Cyprus in 1324
 Hugh (b. 1295/1300, died before May 10, 1349), Count of Jaffa, and then Seneschal of Jerusalem.  Second husband of Isabella of Ibelin, widow of Infante don Fernando de Mallorca and daughter of Philip of Ibelin, Seneschal of Cyprus, and his second wife Maria of Giblet.
 Balian (b. 1298/1300), married Joan of Montfort, daughter of Rupen of Montfort

References

External links
 Templar of Tyre, Online

Counts of Jaffa and Ascalon
13th-century births
1304 deaths
House of Ibelin